The Bangladesh National Scientific and Technical Documentation Centre is the national scientific research archive and provides support to research and development projects in Bangladesh and is located in  Dhaka, Bangladesh.

History
The organisation traces its origins to a regional unit of Pakistan National Scientific and Technical Documentation Centre in East Regional Laboratories of the Pakistan Council of Scientific and Industrial Research. After the Independence of Bangladesh it was reestablished as the Bangladesh National Scientific and Technical Documentation Centre and placed under Bangladesh Council of Scientific and Industrial Research in 1972.

References

Research institutes in Bangladesh
Government agencies of Bangladesh
1972 establishments in Bangladesh
Organisations based in Dhaka